Pulaski is a town in Candler County, Georgia, United States. The population was 266 at the 2010 census.

History
The Georgia General Assembly incorporated Pulaski as a town in 1905. The town was named for Count Casimir Pulaski, a Revolutionary War hero.

Geography
Pulaski is located in eastern Candler County at  (32.390979, -81.956167). Georgia State Route 46 passes through the town, leading west  to Metter, the county seat.

Demographics

As of the census of 2000, there were 261 people, 73 households, and 48 families residing in the town. The racial makeup of the town was 50.19% White, 27.20% African American, 20.31% from other races, and 2.30% from two or more races. Hispanic or Latino of any race were 22.22% of the population.

There were 73 households, out of which 28.8% had children under the age of 18 living with them, 49.3% were married couples living together, 11.0% had a female householder with no husband present, and 34.2% were non-families. 27.4% of all households were made up of individuals, and 15.1% had someone living alone who was 65 years of age or older.  The average household size was 2.62 and the average family size was 3.04.

In the town, the population was spread out, with 17.6% under the age of 18, 8.0% from 18 to 24, 20.3% from 25 to 44, 23.4% from 45 to 64, and 30.7% who were 65 years of age or older.  The median age was 47 years. For every 100 females, there were 143.9 males.  For every 100 females age 18 and over, there were 136.3 males.

The median income for a household in the town was $26,667, and the median income for a family was $29,375. Males had a median income of $23,393 versus $20,208 for females. The per capita income for the town was $11,446.  About 16.7% of families and 15.7% of the population were below the poverty line, including 22.0% of those under the age of eighteen and 19.5% of those 65 or over.

See also

 List of municipalities in Georgia (U.S. state)

References

External links

 Pulaski historical marker

Towns in Candler County, Georgia
Towns in Georgia (U.S. state)